Jacinta Beecher (born 31 January 1998) is an Australian sprinter.

Beecher was a promising junior but the Queenslander suffered 4 years of injuries before posting a new personal best time over 200 metres of 23.28 in Canberra in 2021.

Beecher moved into the top 10 of all time Australian 200 metres runners when she ran a time of 22.70 in May 2022 in Shizuoka, Japan. With that time Beecher achieved the qualifying standard for the 2022 Commonwealth Games as well as the World Championships. Whilst competing at the 2022 World Athletics Championships – Women's 200 metres Beecher qualified from the heats for the semi-finals with a run of 23.22 behind Jenna Prandini and Favour Ofili.

References

1998 births
Living people
World Athletics Championships athletes for Australia
Sportswomen from Queensland
Australian female sprinters
20th-century Australian women
21st-century Australian women